The flag of North Brabant consists of a chequy pattern with 24 distinct fields in the colours red and white or gules and argent. The flag has been used since the Middle Ages, but fell into disuse in the 18th century. The flag is now back in use, and has been the official flag of North Brabant since 1959.

The flag of the province of North Brabant was adopted by the Provincial Council on January 21, 1959. In addition, the following description was used: "Rectangular, consisting of four horizontal stripes, divided into six adjacent surfaces of red and white and six vertical lines, divided into four adjacent sides of red and white."

The coat of arms of Croatia and the flag of the Belgian province of Antwerp make use of the same pattern, but the flag of Antwerp makes use of the colors red, white, blue and yellow.

History
The North Brabantian flag dates from the Middle Ages. The colors gules and argent are used in Brabant standards, flags, and pennants since the proclamation of the County of Louvain (942 CE) during the Lotharingian period. Later the Duchy of Brabant took these colors on. During the Middle Ages and the centuries after the red and white would be often used. Ships sailed under a red-white flag, especially in Antwerp.
At the end of the 18th century, the flag fell into disuse. Only since 1959 has the red and white checkered flag become the official flag of the province of North Brabant.

Highest seniority
North Brabant flag has the highest seniority among all Dutch province flags. For that reason, it hung until 2006 immediately to the right of the throne of the monarch in the Ridderzaal. On official occasions, the flag should always be on the very left side for the spectators. As of Prinsjesdag 2006, the flags in de Ridderzaal were replaced by tapestries bearing the provincial coat of arms.

References

942 establishments
Flags of the Netherlands
Flag
Red and white flags
Flags introduced in 1959